Cinema Village is a movie theater in Greenwich Village, New York. It is the oldest continuously operated cinema in Greenwich Village.

It was opened in 1963, housed in a converted firehouse on 12th Street.

Since the 1980s, It has been owned by Nick Nicolaou, a Cypriot immigrant who came to the United States at age 12. In 1975 at the age of 15, he began working at Cinema Village. In three years at age 18, he was general manager. He later bought the cinema. Nicolaou's story is told in the film The Projectionist by Abel Ferrara.

Cinema Village is part of numerous film festivals, including: The New York Short Film Festival, The Manhattan Film Festival, The Other Israel, Workers United, Kino Film Festival, African Diaspora International, Winter Film Awards International Film Festival, Socially Relevant Film Festival, HUMP, Reel Recovery, Wildlife Conservatory, and Arab Cinema week.

See also
List of art cinemas in New York City

References

External links
 Cinema Village - 22 East 12th Street Manhattan, New York, NY 10003 About Us - Cinema Village

1963 establishments in New York City
Cinemas and movie theaters in Manhattan
Repertory cinemas
Greenwich Village